Jack Donner (October 29, 1928 – September 21, 2019) was an American actor whose career in theater, television and film extended over six decades.

Career 
A native of Los Angeles, Donner worked in television and film since the 1950s including early work on The Guiding Light and As the World Turns. Honing his craft, he performed in seven successive seasons of New York City regional and stock theater. 

Beginning in the 1960s he had many guest star and co-starring roles in shows including The Man from U.N.C.L.E., Mission Impossible, Mannix, Kojak and The Streets of San Francisco. However, he was probably best known for his role of Romulan Subcommander Tal in the original Star Trek episode "The Enterprise Incident". He later returned as a Vulcan priest in the episodes "Kir'Shara" and "Home" of Star Trek: Enterprise. Along with Joseph Ruskin and Clint Howard, he is one of only three actors to appear in both the original Star Trek series and Star Trek: Enterprise. In 1998 he appeared in the uncredited role of Commander Kinwon in Power Rangers in Space. He had a recurring role on General Hospital as Nikolas and Spencer Cassadine's butler, Alfred.

Donner starred in Peaches Christ's black comedy film All About Evil and in Bryan Moore's adaptation of H. P. Lovecraft's Cool Air. He also had a brief but memorable scene as a fire-and-brimstone prosecutor who demands death in 1971's The Night God Screamed.

He founded Oxford Theater with fellow actor Lee Delano. Their students included Barry Levinson, Craig T. Nelson, Barbara Parkins, and Don Johnson.

Filmography

Film

Television

References

External links
 
 
 
 

1928 births
2019 deaths
American male stage actors
American male film actors
American male television actors
Place of death missing
Male actors from Los Angeles
20th-century American male actors
21st-century American male actors